Fourchu is a small community located on Nova Scotia Route 247 in Richmond County on Cape Breton Island.

References

Fourchu on Destination Nova Scotia

Communities in Richmond County, Nova Scotia
General Service Areas in Nova Scotia